Vaniyamkulam-II is a village in the Palakkad district, state of Kerala, India.  Together with Vaniyamkulam-I, it forms a part of the Vaniamkulam gram panchayat.

Demographics
 India census, Vaniyamkulam-II had a population of 15,094 with 7,122 males and 7,972 females.

References

Vanuyamkulam-II